Appropriate is a 2014 play by American playwright Branden Jacobs-Jenkins.

Productions 
Appropriate began previews Off-Broadway on February 25, 2014, in The Alice Griffin Jewel Box Theatre at the Pershing Square Signature Center, New York. It had its opening night on March 16, 2014, playing a limited run to April 6.

Appropriate opened at the Donmar Warehouse in London August 22, 2019, following previews from August 16. It played a limited run to October 5.

Cast and characters

References 

Off-Broadway plays
2014 plays